Adriosaurus is an extinct genus of squamate which lived in what is now Slovenia and other parts of Europe during the Late Cretaceous. This is the first fossil record of vestigial limbs in lizards. It lost its manus and forearm completely in order to elongate its axial skeleton. These unique anatomical features led to discussions of the evolutionary patterns of limb reduction in Squamata.

Adriosaurus includes three species: A. microbrachis (“micro”, meaning small, and “brachis”, meaning arm, referring to the vestigial forelimb composed of only the humerus), A skrbinensis (named after the location where they found the fossil, Skrbina, northwest of Komen, Slovenia) and A. suessi. However, A. microbrachis lacks many crucial characters to be qualified for cladistic analysis, thus it's not included in the list of terminal taxa.

History and Discovery 

Adriosaurus was first described by Seeley (1881) based on a single specimen from near Comen, Slovenia. This fossil consists of the posterior half of the vertebral column, the pelvis and hindlimbs. Later Nopcsa (1908, 1923) described a nearly complete skeleton from Hvar, Croatia. However, at that time, Nopsca's systematic conclusions were not accurate. Michael S. Y. Lee and Michael W. Caldwell redescribed Adriosaurus suessi specimen NHMR2867.

In 2004, Michael S. Y. Lee and Michael W. Caldwell reevaluated Acteosaurus crassicostatus which was based on a small lizard fossil found in Comen, Slovenia. They classified this into A. suessi rather than a new species.

In 2007, Michael W. Caldwell and Alessandro Palci described a new species from Adriosaurus. The only specimen they had for A. microbranchis (MCSNT 7792) was an articulated specimen missing the skull, and part of the cervical and caudal skeleton.

In 2010, Michael W. Caldwell and Alessandro Palci described A. skrbinensis. This new species was about 60% larger than the other two known species within Adriosaurus. The specimen SMNH 2158 was found in a small village in Komen, Slovenia. It's a relatively well-preserved natural molds specimen with most of the skull, parts of the vertebrae, parts of limbs and pelvic girdle.

Geological and paleoenvironmental information 
Adriosaurus could live in both marine and terrestrial environments. According to its limb arrangement, it likely lived beside the shoreline. Most of the Adriosaurus fossils were found in Slovenia and preserved in limestone.

Description 
It had 10 cervical, 29 dorsal, and at least 65 caudal vertebrae. It had a unique feature called pachyostosis, an anatomical feature that thickened the periosteal bone by increasing the osteogenic activity of periosteum.  Both its forelimbs and hindlimbs were reduced in size, which suggests that it lived in a marine environment.

A. skrbinensis was a small marine squamate with 30 dorsal vertebrae. Unlike A. suessi, A. skrbinesis had forelimbs which were much more reduced than the hindlimbs. It had a humerus/femur ratio of 0.40, compared to 0.61 in A. suessi and 0.62 in A. microbrachis. In its gastric contents, there was phosphatic matter which was probably the remains of small fishes. This suggests that A. skrbinensis was likely a piscivore.

Vertebrae 
There are ten cervical vertebrae present in A. suessi and none of them are pachyostotic. The shoulder girdle is placed after the tenth presacral and the following vertebrae connect to large, pachyostotic ribs. This can infer that the distinction between the cervical and dorsal vertebrae was between vertebrae 10 and 11. The neural arch is wide with both anteriorly and posteriorly lateral expansions. The neural spine extends vertical along the length of the neural arch.

There are 29 dorsal vertebrae with large ribs. Compared to the cervical vertebrae, the neural arch of the dorsal vertebrae is much wider and swollen. With less prominent transverse processes, the ribs articulate with the body of the centrum. Most ribs are heavily ossified and pachyostotic. They are most ossified and thickened at the middle of the dorsal region, while the anterior and posterior part of the dorsal region appear to be normal. And the pachyostosis is most prominent in the proximal half, with the distal half of the shaft being less ossified.

There are two sacral vertebrae. They are similar to the dorsal vertebrae, except for the ribs. The sacrals are fused to the centra.

There are 65 caudal vertebrae with narrow neural arches. Transverse processes are present on the anterior caudals and gradually diminish in size posteriorly and disappear at about vertebra 27. Caudal autotomy septa are absent.

For A. skrbinensis, there were 10 cervical vertebrae, 30 dorsal vertebrae, and 2 sacral vertebrae. The body of the dorsal vertebrae presents a procoelous pattern.

Paleobiology

Locomotion 
The flat distal regions of the limbs could be used as paddles for very slow swimming and maneuvering. When it needed more rapid bursts, lateral undulation might be applied with the limbs pressed against the sides. It could also walk on land, but with its small limbs it could only walk slowly.

Compared to other swimming locomotion, such as carangiform axial locomotion (tuna-like swimming), Adriosaurus swam mainly by lateral undulation because of its laterally compressed body, flattened tail, and small limbs. The thickening skeleton of the middle dorsal region reduced swimming speed and maneuverability. Thus, Adriosaurus was a relatively slow swimmer. Its living environment was likely to be near-shore, and calm environments.

Diet 
Adriosaurus had sharp, recurved teeth and a relatively large skull to its body size. These features indicate that it was a predator. However, its swimming abilities were not excellent. Thus, it most likely attacked prey unexpectedly. And its body size was not large, so it might have predated on small fishes and invertebrates.

Origin of snakes 
In regard of the origin of snakes, paleontologists and zoologists held different opinions. After the discovery of mid-Cretaceous snake-like lizards, paleontological research linked snakes to mosasauroid lizards which once lived in marine environment, while zoologists linked snakes to limb-reduced squamates which implied a terrestrial origin. But so far, with cladistic analyses of squamate interrelationship, scientists still cannot come to an agreement about the origin of snakes.

Classification and species 
Adriosaurus has three species which are A. microbrachis, A. skrbinensis and A. suessi. A. skrbinensis and A. suessi are present on the cladogram.

Cladogram based on Palci and Caldwell (2010a), Caldwell and Palci (2010b):

References

Late Cretaceous lepidosaurs of Europe
Cretaceous lizards
Fossil taxa described in 1881
Taxa named by Harry Seeley